Fatty's Reckless Fling is a 1915 American short comedy film directed by and starring Fatty Arbuckle.

Cast
 Roscoe 'Fatty' Arbuckle as Fatty
 Edgar Kennedy as Neighbor
 Minta Durfee as Neighbor's Wife
 Katherine Griffith as Fatty's Wife
 Billie Walsh as Bartender
 Glen Cavender as House detective
 Frank Hayes as Card Player (uncredited)
 Ted Edwards as Card Player (uncredited)
 Grover Ligon as Card Player (uncredited)
 Venice Hayes as Girl Fatty Sits On (uncredited)
 Harry McCoy as Drunk (uncredited)
 George Ovey as Card Player (uncredited)

See also
 List of American films of 1915
 Fatty Arbuckle filmography

References

External links

1915 films
Films directed by Roscoe Arbuckle
Films produced by Mack Sennett
Keystone Studios films
1915 comedy films
1915 short films
American silent short films
American black-and-white films
Silent American comedy films
American comedy short films
1910s American films
1910s English-language films